Plasketlands is a small settlement in the civil parish of Holme St. Cuthbert in Cumbria, United Kingdom. It is located approximately a quarter-of-a-mile south-west of Goodyhills, a quarter-of-a-mile to the south of the hamlet of Holme St. Cuthbert, and one-and-a-half miles east of Mawbray. Carlisle, Cumbria's county town, is twenty-four miles away to the north-east. The settlement is divided into two distinct parts: High Plasketlands and Plasketlands. Jordan beck, a tributary of the Black Dub beck, flows through Plasketlands on its way to Allonby Bay.

History and etymology
The name Plasketlands comes from the Old English plashet, meaning "a fence of living wood". It was historically spelled several different ways, including Plassegaytt,  Plaskitlands, Plascade-lands, and Plesketh Landes.

Evidence of settlement at Plasketlands goes back thousands of years. A palisade of posts at Plasketlands has been radiocarbon dated to somewhere between 4000 BC and 2500 BC.

References

Hamlets in Cumbria
Holme St Cuthbert